The Almost Impossible Gameshow is a British game show that aired on ITV2 from 1 October 2015 to 11 May 2016 and is hosted by The Rubberbandits.

Gameplay
Each contestant starts the contest with 50 lives, and takes on a series of games. These games are designed to be extremely difficult, hence the show's name. For each attempt that ends in failure, the contestant loses one life and must reattempt the game. The contestant can only move on to another game after one successful attempt, or after failing the game outright by making 15 failed attempts. If the contestant can successfully complete five games before running out of lives, they win a trophy; any contestant who runs out of lives is out of the game.

Games
Games are sorted into seven zones: Tunnel, Paddock, Hill, Runway, Mud Pit, Hangar and Pool.

Contestants and winners
Each episode has 10 contestants and many episodes ended with all the contestants out of the game, either due to running out of lives or for medical reasons. There was one winner in Series 2: Leo the medical student.

International Versions
An American version was produced in the United States under the same name, but only aired 2 episodes on MTV. The Rubberbandits also narrated this version. In this version, contestants were only given 40 lives, failed a challenge outright after 10 failed attempts, and only needed to complete four challenges to win. In addition to the trophy, winning contestants received a cash prize of $500.

References

External links
 
 
 

2015 British television series debuts
2016 British television series endings
2010s British game shows
English-language television shows
ITV game shows
Television series by Banijay